Kerri Simpson is a blues singer from Melbourne. Her album Confessin' the Blues was nominated for a 1999 ARIA Award for Best Blues & Roots Album.

Predominantly a blues musician, she has also performed country with Kerri Simpson and the Prodigal Sons, gospel with the Gospel Belles and Ska with The Ska Vendors. Gospel Belles were formed in 2006 and consists of singers Kerri Simpson, Kelly Auty, Marisa Quigley and Diana Wolfe. The Ska Vendors is a Ska band fronted by Melbourne Ska Orchestra's Steve Montgomery alongside Simpson, Steve Phillips, Chris Rogers, Johnny Holmes, Dean Hilson, Sarah Heffernon, Russell Roberts, Michael Havir and Pat Powell.

Discography

Albums

Awards and nominations

ARIA Music Awards
The ARIA Music Awards is an annual awards ceremony that recognises excellence, innovation, and achievement across all genres of Australian music. 

|-
| ARIA Music Awards of 1999
| Confessin' the Blues
| ARIA Award for Best Blues and Roots Album
| 
|-

Music Victoria Awards
The Music Victoria Awards are an annual awards night celebrating Victorian music. They commenced in 2006.

! 
|-
| Music Victoria Awards of 2014
| 4am
| Best Blues Album
| 
| 
|-

References

External links
 Kerri Simpson Official site

Australian women singers
Living people
Year of birth missing (living people)